The 1977 Virginia Slims of Los Angeles  was a women's tennis tournament played on indoor carpet courts at the Memorial Sports Arena  in Los Angeles, California in the United States that was part of the 1977 Virginia Slims World Championship Series. It was the fourth edition of the tournament and was held from February 14 through February 20, 1977. First-seeded Chris Evert won the singles title and earned $20,000 first-prize money.

Finals

Singles
 Chris Evert defeated  Martina Navratilova 6–2, 2–6, 6–1
 It was Evert's 4th singles title of the year and the 71st of her career.

Doubles
 Rosemary Casals /  Chris Evert defeated  Martina Navratilova /  Betty Stöve 6–2, 6–4

Prize money

See also
 Evert–Navratilova rivalry

References

External links
 ITF tournament edition details

Virginia Slims of Los Angeles
LA Women's Tennis Championships
Virginia Slims of Los Angeles
Virginia Slims of Los Angeles
Virginia Slims of Los Angeles